NGC 1004 is an elliptical galaxy in the constellation Cetus.

References 

Cetus (constellation)
1004
Elliptical galaxies
009961